Perevolochnoye is a rural locality (a selo) in Khreshchatovskoye Rural Settlement, Kalacheyevsky District, Voronezh Oblast, Russia. The population was 464 as of 2010. There are 10 streets.

Geography 
Perevolochnoye is located 38 km southwest of Kalach (the district's administrative centre) by road. Khreshchatoye is the nearest rural locality.

References 

Rural localities in Kalacheyevsky District